"Bats!" is the debut single by Los Angeles-based punk rock band The Bronx, released in 2003 by Tarantulas Records. It was produced by Beau Burchell and recorded at his home in Los Angeles. The single was released on both compact disc and 12-inch vinyl, the latter a picture disc limited to 1,000 copies. The B-side is backmasked, playing from the inner edge to the outer.

Track listing

CD version

Vinyl version

Personnel

Band
 Matt Caughthran – lead vocals
 Joby J. Ford – guitar, backing vocals, graphic design
 James Tweedy – bass guitar, backing vocals
 Jorma Vik – drums

Production
 Beau Burchell – producer, recording
 Don C. Tyler – mastering

See also
The Bronx discography

References

2003 debut singles
2003 songs
The Bronx (band) songs